"When the Right One Comes Along" is a song recorded by actor and American country music artist John Schneider.  It was released in July 1987 as the second single from the album You Ain't Seen the Last of Me.  The song reached #32 on the Billboard Hot Country Singles & Tracks chart.  The song was written by Russell Smith and John Hooker.

Chart performance

References

1987 singles
1987 songs
John Schneider (screen actor) songs
Songs written by Russell Smith (singer)
Song recordings produced by Jimmy Bowen
MCA Records singles